Penstemon arkansanus is a species of flowering plant in the plantain family known by the common name Arkansas beardtongue. It is endemic to Texas, Arkansas, Oklahoma, Missouri, and Illinois in the United States, occurring in rocky or sandy soils of shale or sandstone.

Description

The stems are greyish and puberulent, often turning purplish. The thyrse makes up just less than half of the plant, with three to nine fascicles that are each composed of two axillary branches. The pedicels are shorter than the main peduncle. The plant differs from Penstemon pallidus only in its tendency to be more glabrous.

The plant flowers from late May into early June.

References

arkansanus
Flora of Arkansas
Plants described in 1922